Jabe Pond is a lake located west of Silver Bay, New York. Fish species present in the lake are brook trout, rainbow smelt, brown trout, rainbow trout, and brown bullhead. There is a carry down trail on the north shore via a dirt road from Silver Bay. No motors are allowed on this lake.

As of 2019-08-26 Google Maps has incorrect directions to the hiking trail head at Jabe Pond. From the south, take Split Rock road, not Terrace road (which crosses private property).

References

Lakes of New York (state)
Lakes of Warren County, New York